The 2016 Autobacs Super GT Series was the twenty-fourth season of the Japan Automobile Federation Super GT Championship including the All Japan Grand Touring Car Championship (JGTC) era, and the twelfth season under the name Super GT. It was the thirty-fourth overall season of a national JAF sportscar championship dating back to the All Japan Sports Prototype Championship. The season began on April 10 and ended on November 13, after 8 races.

Schedule

Calendar Changes
 The Super GT in Kyushu 300km at Autopolis was scheduled for May 22nd as the third round of the season but was subsequently cancelled in the aftermath of the 2016 Kumamoto earthquakes. On May 20th, series organizers announced that the final weekend at Twin Ring Motegi would host two 250 kilometer races, with the race on Saturday being promoted as "Round 3" of the championship as it replaces the Autopolis race.
 The SUGO GT 300km was brought forward to July from its previous date in September.
 The overseas round at Buriram, Thailand was moved from its 2015 date of June to October. The series first visited the circuit in October 2014.

Drivers and Teams

GT500

GT300

Driver Changes

Team Transfers
 Andrea Caldarelli switched from the KeePer TOM's team to the Wako's LeMans team.
 Yuji Kunimoto moved over from Team LeMans to drive for the WedsSport BANDOH team.
 Two-time and defending 1000 km Suzuka winner James Rossiter switched from the Petronas TOM's team to the KeePer TOM's team.
 Takashi Kogure and Hideki Mutoh swapped seats within the Honda fleet. Mutoh moved to Drago Modulo Honda Racing alongside Oliver Turvey, while Kogure joined Koudai Tsukakoshi at Keihin Real Racing.
 Katsumasa Chiyo stepped up to the GT500 class for 2016 driving for MOLA, after helping GAINER secure their first GT300 championship last season.
 Masataka Yanagida moved from MOLA to Kondo Racing, his third different team in four seasons.
 After participating in selected rounds last year, Ryuichiro Tomita became a full-time driver of the #0 GAINER Nissan GT-R.
 Kota Sasaki drove a second Toyota Prius GT for apr.

Entering Super GT
 Reigning Japanese Formula 3 champion Nick Cassidy joined the number 36 TOM's team. He was the first driver from New Zealand to race in the series since Mark Porter in 1998.
 GT Academy champion and Nissan factory driver Jann Mardenborough joined the NDDP team, partnering Kazuki Hoshino.
 Former Rolex 24 champion Jörg Bergmeister joined Excellence Porsche Team KTR on a full-time basis, after driving two rounds for the team in 2014.
 WEC LMP1 driver Pierre Kaffer drove for Audi Team Braille in his debut GT300 campaign.
 Porsche Carrera Cup Japan champion Yuya Motojima, as well as fellow PCCJ drivers Rintaro Kubo and Hiroaki Nagai, moved to GT300, driving for Team Taisan SARD, Arnage Racing, and apr respectively.
 Shinnosuke Yamada graduated from the F4 Japanese Championship to race for Team Upgarage with Bandoh.
 South African Adrian Zaugg and Japanese-Italian driver Kei Cozzolino made their Super GT debuts for Lamborghini Team Direction.

Leaving Super GT
 Three-time GT500 champion Juichi Wakisaka announced his retirement from racing at the Toyota Gazoo Racing press conference on February 4. He will stay in the series as the team principal of Lexus Team Wako's LeMans.
 Inaugural GT Academy champion Lucas Ordóñez returned to racing in Europe, competing in the Blancpain GT Series for NISMO RJN Motorsport.
 Mitsunori Takaboshi left the series after a successful rookie season with NDDP to drive in Blancpain GT. However, he returned for the fourth race of the season at Fuji Speedway.
 Former GT500 champion Michael Krumm had no plans to race in Super GT in 2016 after competing for Kondo Racing last season.
 Alexandre Imperatori left Super GT to focus on his World Endurance Championship campaign with Rebellion Racing.
 Former 24h Nürburgring winner  did not return to the series after running a partial campaign with Audi Team Racing Tech.

Team Changes

GT500
 Au replaced Petronas as the title sponsor of the number 36 TOM's RC-F.
 Petrochemical company WAKO's replaced Eneos as the title sponsor of Team Le Mans.
 Forum Engineering took over from D'Station as the title sponsor of Kondo Racing.

GT300
 Goodsmile Racing with Team UKYO, the number 11 GAINER team, LEON Racing, and Rn-sports fielded the new Mercedes-AMG GT3.
 EVA Racing became the primary sponsor of the Rn-sports AMG.
 apr fielded two new Toyota Prius GTs, with the number 31 car on Bridgestone tyres, and the number 30 on Yokohama tyres.
 Audi Team Hitotsuyama debuted the second-generation Audi R8 LMS and switched from Yokohama to Dunlop Tyres.
 BMW Team Studie and Autobacs Racing Team Aguri used the new BMW M6 GT3 in 2016. ARTA switched to BMW after the retirement of their previous Honda CR-Z, while Studie received additional support from BMW.
 Gulf Racing merged with Pacific Racing Team to form Gulf Racing with PACIFIC, fielding an all-new Porsche 911 GT3-R.
 Excellence Porsche Team KTR also fielded the new 911 GT3-R, and received additional support from Porsche.
 LM Corsa's number 51 team switched from BMW to the new Ferrari 488 GT3. The number 60 team continued to use the Lexus RC-F GT3.
 JLOC was one of two teams introducing the Lamborghini Huracán GT3 to Super GT in 2016.
 Direction Racing changed their name to Lamborghini Team Direction, and also fielded two Huracán GT3s.
 After withdrawing from the 2015 season, Team Taisan returned to GT300 in alliance with SARD.
 Before the start of the season, an entry was announced for Audi Team Braille, with a new 2016 Audi R8 LMS and veteran World Endurance Championship driver Pierre Kaffer. However, the team never appeared in the 2016 season.

Mid-season changes
 From the second round, Team Taisan SARD switched to a 2016 model Audi R8 LMS.

Results

Championship Standings
Scoring system

Drivers' championships

GT500

GT300

References

External links
 Official website

2016
Super GT